Vladimir Vladimirovich Strelchenko (born 25 April 1964 in Novosibirsk) was mayor of Khimki (Russian town in Moscow Oblast, in the vicinity of Moscow) since 2005 to 2012. He had made his career in the Soviet and Russian army, participating in the Soviet–Afghan War in the late 1980s and retiring in 1999 as Colonel. Subsequently, he worked as an official in the Moscow and Moscow Oblast governments. From 2005 to 2010, he was a president of FC Khimki.

Motorsport career
Since 2005, Strelchenko is competing in RTCC, he is Champion of Russia in Touring class (2009) and Cup of Russia winner in Super Production (2013).

References

Politicians from Novosibirsk
Soviet military personnel of the Soviet–Afghan War
1964 births
Living people
People from Khimki
Military personnel from Novosibirsk
Russian Circuit Racing Series drivers
Frunze Military Academy alumni

Russian racing drivers